Zimný štadion Martin is an indoor arena in Martin, Slovakia.  It is primarily used for ice hockey local club HK Martin. Arena has a capacity of 4,200 people and was constructed in 1977. 
In 2004 Martin hosted 3rd WORLD JUNIOR CHAMPIONSHIP STREET & BALL HOCKEY, all matches were played in this arena.

Notable events
An overview of some sport events:

2004
2004 ISBHF U20 Junior World Championships

Indoor ice hockey venues in Slovakia
Buildings and structures in Žilina Region